Francisco Mora may refer to:

Francisco Blake Mora (1966–2011), Mexican lawyer and politician
Francisco de Mora (1553–1610), Spanish Renaissance architect
Francisco Mora Ciprés (born 1961), Mexican politician
Francisco Mora (painter) (born 1922), Mexican painter
Francisco Mora (racing driver) (born 1996), Portuguese racing driver
Francisco Mora (rower) (born 1952), Cuban Olympic rower
Francisco Mora y Borrell (1827–1905),  Catalan American Roman Catholic priest
Francisco Lluch Mora (1924–2006), Puerto Rican historian, writer, and teacher
Francisco O. Mora, American academic and government official
José Francisco Mora (born 1981), Spanish footballer

See also
Mora (surname)